Cameron Darkwah (born 2 September 1992) is an English footballer who plays as a midfielder for Stalybridge Celtic.

Club career

Stockport County
Born in Miles Platting, Manchester, Darkwah made his debut for Stockport County on 16 October 2010, coming on as a substitute as part of the 2–1 victory over Barnet. In May 2011, he agreed a new one-year deal with the club.

In August 2011, he joined Mossley on loan scoring a hat-trick in a 6–2 win over Ossett Albion. He followed that up with the only goal of the game against Garforth and another strike in their 2–1 win over Salford. His loan was extended at the end of the initial loan period, having scored five goals in five matches.

In January 2012, he joined FC Halifax Town for his second loan period of the season. On his debut for the Shaymen, he came off the bench and scored an equalising goal in the 2–1 win against Worcester City at The Shay. With his loan deal coming towards and end, Darkwah was sent off away at Eastwood Town in a 2–2 draw for kicking out at an opposition player.

He played again for Stockport on his return from loan. He was offered a further deal by the club in May 2012. On 23 August, he stated he will be leaving the club after rejecting another contract offer. On 31 August, he accepted a new deal, deciding to remain with the club.

On 26 September, he moved to Colwyn Bay on loan for an initial one-month period where he made his club debut on 29 September against Brackley Town. His loan period was later extended until the end of the year.

Cameron signed a deal for Garry Flitcroft at Chorley on 6 February 2013 and played for the club until June 2013, before returning to Colwyn Bay.

In 2017 he played for Stockport Town.

On 30 June 2022, Darkwah joined Stalybridge Celtic.

Career statistics

References

External links

1992 births
Living people
Association football midfielders
Black British sportsmen
English footballers
Colwyn Bay F.C. players
FC Halifax Town players
Mossley A.F.C. players
Stockport County F.C. players
English Football League players
National League (English football) players
English people of Ghanaian descent
Northern Premier League players
Expatriate footballers in Wales
Chorley F.C. players
Ilkeston F.C. players
Stockport Town F.C. players
Abbey Hey F.C. players
Stalybridge Celtic F.C. players
People from Miles Platting
Footballers from Manchester